Roseisle is an unincorporated community in south central Manitoba, Canada. It is located approximately 96 kilometres (60 miles) southwest of Winnipeg in the Rural Municipality of Dufferin.

References 

Unincorporated communities in Pembina Valley Region